Harry John Grumpelt (March 2, 1885 – November 3, 1973) was an American high jumper and accountant. He competed at the 1912 Summer Olympics and finished sixth. Grumpelt won the AAU title in 1910 (indoors) and 1911 (outdoors); he placed second outdoors in 1908, 1910 and 1912, and third in 1914.  Grumpelt was bursar of the New York Public Library until his 1950 retirement.

References

1885 births
1973 deaths
American male high jumpers
Olympic track and field athletes of the United States
Athletes (track and field) at the 1912 Summer Olympics
New York Public Library people
American accountants